The 2016 Senior Open Championship was a senior major golf championship and the 30th Senior Open Championship, held on 21–24 July at Carnoustie Golf Links in Angus, Scotland. It was the second Senior Open Championship played at the course and the 14th Senior Open Championship played as a senior major championship.

Paul Broadhurst won by two strokes over Scott McCarron. It was Broadhurst's first senior major championship victory.

Venue

The 2016 event was the second Senior Open Championship played at the Carnoustie Golf Links. The previous event was in 2010, with Bernhard Langer winning his first of four Senior Open Championships.

Championship Course 
  

Source:

Field
The field consisted of 144 competitors;  professionals and amateurs.

An 18-hole stroke play qualifying round was held on Monday, 18 July, for players who were not already exempt. Players from the qualifying competition joined the exempt players for the championship.

71 players, all of them professionals and no amateurs, made the 36-hole cut.

Past champions in the field
Five past Senior Open champions participated. Four of them made the 36-hole cut; 2010 and 2014 champion Bernhard Langer (9th), 2003, 2005 and 2007 champion Tom Watson (tied 27th), 2015 champion Marco Dawson (tied 60th) and 2011 champion Russ Cochran (tied 66th). 2002 champion Noboru Sugai did not make the cut.

Past winners of The Open Championship in the field
The field included seven former winners of The Open Championship. Five of them made the cut; 1996 Open champion Tom Lehman (tied 14th), 1998 Open champion Mark O'Meara (tied 18th), 1975, 1977, 1980, 1982 and 1983 Open champion Tom Watson (tied 27th), 1995 Open champion John Daly (tied 54th) and 1989 Open champion Mark Calcavecchia (70th). 2004 Open champion Todd Hamilton and 1985 Open champion Sandy Lyle missed the cut.

Final results
Sunday, 24 July 2016

References

External links
Results on European Tour website

Senior major golf championships
Golf tournaments in England
Senior Open Championship
Senior Open Championship
Senior Open Championship